The men's pole vault event at the 1934 British Empire Games was held on 6 August at the White City Stadium in London, England.

Results

* Apps jumped 12 feet 9 inches in a jump off for first place.

References

Athletics at the 1934 British Empire Games
1934